Nawaf Al-Farshan (born 8 July 1998) is a Saudi Arabian professional footballer who plays as a midfielder for Al-Shoulla.

Honours

Club
Al-Nassr
 Saudi Professional League: 2018–19

References

External links

1998 births
Living people
Saudi Arabian footballers
Association football midfielders
Al Nassr FC players
Al-Hazem F.C. players
Al-Ain FC (Saudi Arabia) players
Hajer FC players
Al-Shoulla FC players
Saudi Professional League players
Saudi First Division League players